ILAC may refer to:

Institutional Learning and Change Initiative 
International Language Academy of Canada
International Laboratory Accreditation Cooperation
Ilac Shopping Centre, Dublin, Ireland